Following is a list of dams and reservoirs in Kentucky.

All major dams are linked below.

Dams and reservoirs in Kentucky 

This list is incomplete.  You can help Wikipedia by expanding it.

 Barkley Dam, Lake Barkley, United States Army Corps of Engineers
 Barren River Lake Dam, Barren River Lake, USACE
 Buckhorn Lake Dam, Buckhorn Lake, USACE
 Cannelton Locks and Dam, Ohio River, USACE (between Indiana and Kentucky)
 Captain Anthony Meldahl Locks and Dam, Ohio River, USACE (between Ohio and Kentucky)
 Cave Run Lake Dam, Cave Run Lake, USACE
 portions of the Dale Hollow Reservoir, dammed in Tennessee, USACE
 Dewey Dam, Dewey Lake, USACE
 Dix Dam, Herrington Lake, Kentucky Utilities
 Fishtrap Dam, Fishtrap Lake, USACE
 Grayson Dam, Grayson Lake, USACE
 Green River Lake Dam, Green River Lake, USACE
 Greenup Locks and Dam, Ohio River, USACE (between Ohio and Kentucky)
 John T. Myers Locks and Dam, Ohio River, USACE (between Indiana and Kentucky)
 Kentucky Dam, Kentucky Lake, Tennessee Valley Authority
 Laurel River Dam, Laurel River Lake, USACE
 Markland Locks and Dam, Ohio River, USACE (between Indiana and Kentucky)
 McAlpine Locks and Dam, Ohio River, USACE (between Indiana and Kentucky)
 Newburgh Locks and Dam, Ohio River, USACE (between Indiana and Kentucky)
 Nolin Lake Dam, Nolin River Lake, USACE
 Olmsted Locks and Dam, Ohio River, USACE (under construction between Illinois and Kentucky)
 Paintsville Dam, Paintsville Lake, USACE
 Renfro Dam, Lake Linville, Commonwealth of Kentucky
 Rough River Lake Dam, Rough River Lake, USACE
 Smithland Locks and Dam, Ohio River, USACE (between Illinois and Kentucky)
 Taylorsville Lake Dam, Taylorsville Lake, USACE
 Wolf Creek Dam, Lake Cumberland, USACE
 Wood Creek Lake Dam, Wood Creek Lake, Commonwealth of Kentucky
 Yatesville Dam, Yatesville Lake, USACE

References 

 
 
Kentucky
Dams
Dams